CanJet was serving the following destinations in December 2012:

Americas

South America
 Colombia
 Cartagena - Rafael Núñez International Airport
 San Andres Island, Colombia - Gustavo Rojas Pinilla International Airport
 Venezuela
 Porlamar - Del Caribe "Santiago Mariño" International Airport

Caribbean
 Antigua and Barbuda
St. John's - V. C. Bird International Airport
 Aruba
Oranjestad - Queen Beatrix International Airport
 Barbados
 Christ Church - Grantley Adams International Airport
 Cuba
 Camagüey - Ignacio Agramonte International Airport
 Cayo Coco - Jardines del Rey Airport
 Cayo Largo - Vilo Acuña Airport
 Holguín - Frank País Airport
 Santa Clara - Abel Santamaría Airport
 Santiago de Cuba - Antonio Maceo Airport
 Varadero - Juan Gualberto Gómez Airport
 Dominican Republic
 La Romana - La Romana International Airport
 Puerto Plata - Gregorio Luperón International Airport
 Punta Cana International Airport
 Samaná - Samaná El Catey International Airport
 Santo Domingo - Las Américas International Airport
 Jamaica
Montego Bay - Sangster International Airport
 Martinique
 Fort-de-France - Martinique Aimé Césaire International Airport
 Saint Maarten
 Philipsburg - Princess Juliana International Airport
 Trinidad and Tobago
 Port of Spain - Piarco International Airport
 Turks and Caicos Islands
 Providenciales International Airport
 Saint Lucia
 Vieux Fort - Hewanorra International Airport

Central America
 Costa Rica
 Liberia - Daniel Oduber Quirós International Airport
 San José - Juan Santamaría International Airport
 Honduras
 San Pedro Sula - Ramón Villeda Morales International Airport
 La Ceiba - Golosón International Airport
 Roatán - Juan Manuel Gálvez International Airport
 Panama
 Panama City - Tocumen International Airport
 El Salvador
 San Salvador - Monseñor Óscar Arnulfo Romero International Airport
  Guatemala
 Guatemala - La Aurora International Airport

North America
 Canada
 Alberta
 Calgary International Airport
 Edmonton International Airport
 Fort McMurray Airport
 British Columbia
Abbotsford - Abbotsford International Airport
Comox - Comox Airport
 Kelowna International Airport
 Vancouver International Airport
Victoria - Victoria International Airport
 Manitoba
 Winnipeg James Armstrong Richardson International Airport
 New Brunswick
 Fredericton International Airport
 Newfoundland and Labrador
 St. John's - St. John's International Airport
 Deer Lake Regional Airport - Deer Lake, Newfoundland
 Nova Scotia
 Halifax - Halifax Robert L. Stanfield International Airport (base)
 Ontario
 Thunder Bay Airport
Hamilton - Hamilton/John C. Munro International Airport
 London - London International Airport
 Toronto Pearson International Airport (base)
 Ottawa - Macdonald-Cartier International Airport
 Sault Ste. Marie - Sault Ste. Marie Airport
 Quebec
 Montreal - Montréal–Pierre Elliott Trudeau International Airport (base)
 Quebec City - Québec City Jean Lesage International Airport
 Bagotville - Bagotville Airport
 Saskatchewan
Regina - Regina International Airport
 Saskatoon John G. Diefenbaker International Airport
 Mexico
 Acapulco - Alvarez International Airport
 Cancún International Airport
 Cozumel International Airport
 Ixtapa–Zihuatanejo - Ixtapa-Zihuatanejo International Airport
 Manzanillo - Playa de Oro International Airport
 Puerto Vallarta - Licenciado Gustavo Díaz Ordaz International Airport
 United States
 Fort Lauderdale - Fort Lauderdale–Hollywood International Airport
 Orlando - Orlando International Airport
 St. Petersburg - St. Petersburg-Clearwater International Airport

Terminated destinations
Bahamas - Nassau, San Salvador
Nicaragua - Managua
Mexico - Acapulco, Leon/El Bajio
USA - Chicago-Midway, New York-LaGuardia

Lists of airline destinations